Carajas paraua is a species of spiders in the family Caponiidae. It was first described in 2016 by Brescovit & Sánchez-Ruiz. , it is the only member of the genus Carajas.  It is found in Brazil.

References

Caponiidae
Spiders of Brazil
Spiders described in 2016